The TOJ SC303 is a sports prototype race car, designed, developed and built by German racing team and constructor, Team Obermoser Jörg; conforming to the FIA's Group 6 category and specification of motor racing, in 1978. It was unsuccessful Over its racing career, spanning only two races, it didn't manage to win any races, score any pole positions, or even a podium finish, and even failing to qualify for the prestigious 24 Hours of Le Mans that year. It was powered by a naturally-aspirated  Ford-Cosworth DFV V8 engine, producing . It was later replaced by its more successful successor, the SC304.

References

Sports prototypes
24 Hours of Le Mans race cars